Olearia brachyphylla is a species of flowering plant in the family Asteraceae and is endemic to southern continental Australia. It is a densely-branched, aromatic shrub with woolly-hairy stems, oblong to egg-shaped leaves with the narrower end towards the base and small white and pale yellow, daisy-like inflorescences.

Description
The edges of the leaves are rolled under, the lower surface covered with a thin layer of woolly hairs.

Taxonomy
This daisy-bush was first formally described in 1853 by Otto Wilhelm Sonder who gave it the name Eurybia brachyphylla in the journal Linnaea: ein Journal für die Botanik in ihrem ganzen Umfange, oder Beiträge zur Pflanzenkunde, from an unpublished description by Ferdinand von Mueller. In 1956, Norman Arthur Wakefield changed the name to Olearia brachyphylla in The Victorian Naturalist. The specific epithet (brachyphylla) means "short-leaved".

Distribution and habitat
Olearia brachyphylla grows in mallee and heath in southern South Australia, and in the Avon Wheatbelt, Esperance Plains and Mallee biogeographic regions of south-western Western Australia.

References

brachyphylla
Asterales of Australia
Flora of South Australia
Eudicots of Western Australia
Taxa named by Otto Wilhelm Sonder
Plants described in 1853